Alvin Lewis, also known as Al Lewis, (November 12, 1942 – January 31, 2018) was an American professional boxer who fought in the heavyweight division under the alias "Al "Blue" Lewis".

Lewis was a long-term sparring partner of Muhammad Ali and is mentioned in Ali's autobiography. He was well-known as a powerful gym adversary. He also sparred with, among others, George Foreman before the champion's match with Ken Norton.

Professional career
Lewis was born in Detroit and, after a troubled youth background, turned professional in June 1966 in Canton, Ohio. In his debut Lewis faced "Clown Prince" Art Miller. Lewis won this fight with a 1st round knockout.

Other matches
He accrued 15 wins from his debut. In his sixteenth bout, Bob Stallings stopped him in seven in 1967. Lewis won their rematch a year later by a 2nd round knock out. Lewis also fought Leotis Martin twice a while later, losing the first by KO in 9 and the direct rematch by decision. Lewis outpointed fringe contender Dick Wipperman in 1967.

He fought an ageing Cleveland Williams whom he stopped in four in 1970, Oscar Bonavena against whom he lost by disqualification after decking Oscar several times in 1971 and Jack O'Halloran, against whom he lost on points in 1973.

The Ali fight
He is best remembered for a non-title fight with Muhammad Ali which took place at Croke Park in Dublin, Ireland on July 19, 1972, which he lost by an 11th-round TKO. Lewis was outclassed. Down in the 5th it looked like the end. But he rallied onwards. He then surprised many by launching offensives just when it wasn't expected, typically after an Ali burst. The Lewis-Ali event is described in the documentary film, When Ali Came to Ireland.

He last fought in November 1973. His retirement was sudden and unexpected. A Ring Magazine article said he had been helping a priest with a broken-down car when the battery sparked, spitting acid from the engine-bay into one of his eyes. This injury caused his licence to be revoked.

Lewis's final record was 30W(19Ko's)-6L-0D.

One fight struck from his record when the Licensing Authority in Illinois determined that the opponent was not licensed to fight in Illinois and had been a last minute substitution.

Retirement
He last fought in November 1973. His retirement was sudden and unexpected. A Ring Magazine article said he had been helping a priest with a broken-down car when the battery sparked, spitting acid from the engine-bay into one of his eyes. This injury caused his boxing license to be revoked.

Death
Lewis died in Flint, Michigan, on 21 January 2018, at the age of 75. His death was not significantly publicized.

Professional boxing record

|-
|align="center" colspan=8|31 Wins (20 knockouts, 11 decisions), 5 Losses (2 knockouts, 2 decisions, 1 DQ)
|-
| align="center" style="border-style: none none solid solid; background: #e3e3e3"|Result
| align="center" style="border-style: none none solid solid; background: #e3e3e3"|Record
| align="center" style="border-style: none none solid solid; background: #e3e3e3"|Opponent
| align="center" style="border-style: none none solid solid; background: #e3e3e3"|Type
| align="center" style="border-style: none none solid solid; background: #e3e3e3"|Round
| align="center" style="border-style: none none solid solid; background: #e3e3e3"|Date
| align="center" style="border-style: none none solid solid; background: #e3e3e3"|Location
| align="center" style="border-style: none none solid solid; background: #e3e3e3"|Notes
|-align=left
|Win
|
|align=left| JD McCauley
|KO
|2
|November 14, 1973
|align=left| Dayton, Ohio
|align=left|
|-
|Win
|
|align=left| Jimmy Cross
|KO
|6
|September 4, 1973
|align=left| Oklahoma City
|align=left|
|-
|Win
|
|align=left| Humphrey McBride
|TKO
|3
|July 19, 1973
|align=left| Halifax, Nova Scotia
|align=left|
|-
|Loss
|
|align=left| Jack O'Halloran
|PTS
|10
|March 1, 1973
|align=left| Detroit, Michigan
|align=left|
|-
|Win
|
|align=left| Charlie Reno
|PTS
|10
|January 22, 1973
|align=left| Detroit Olympia, Detroit, Michigan
|align=left|
|-
|Loss
|
|align=left| Muhammad Ali
|TKO
|11
|July 19, 1972
|align=left| Croke Park, Dublin
|align=left|
|-
|Loss
|
|align=left| Oscar Bonavena
|DQ
|7
|October 4, 1971
|align=left| Estadio Luna Park, Buenos Aires
|align=left|
|-
|Win
|
|align=left| Bob Mashburn
|TKO
|5
|May 7, 1971
|align=left| Michigan State Fair, Detroit, Michigan
|align=left|
|-
|Win
|
|align=left| Cleveland Williams
|TKO
|4
|October 21, 1970
|align=left| Cobo Arena, Detroit, Michigan
|align=left|
|-
|Win
|
|align=left| Billy Joiner
|UD
|10
|July 15, 1970
|align=left| Madison Square Garden, New York City
|align=left|
|-
|Win
|
|align=left| Edmund Stewart
|TKO
|7
|June 29, 1970
|align=left| Detroit, Michigan
|align=left|
|-
|Win
|
|align=left| Charles "Hercules" Williams
|TKO
|6
|February 27, 1970
|align=left| Michigan State Fair, Detroit, Michigan
|align=left|
|-
|Win
|
|align=left| Bill McMurray
|PTS
|10
|November 19, 1969
|align=left| Cleveland Arena, Cleveland, Ohio
|align=left|
|-
|Win
|
|align=left| Willie McMillan
|PTS
|10
|April 14, 1969
|align=left| Palisades Rink, McKeesport, Pennsylvania
|align=left|
|-
|Loss
|
|align=left| Leotis Martin
|SD
|10
|February 26, 1969
|align=left| Detroit Olympia, Detroit, Michigan
|align=left|
|-
|Loss
|
|align=left| Leotis Martin
|TKO
|9
|November 26, 1968
|align=left| Detroit, Michigan
|align=left|
|-
|Win
|
|align=left| Bob Stallings
|TKO
|2
|September 21, 1968
|align=left| Detroit, Michigan
|align=left|
|-
|Win
|
|align=left| Hector Eduardo Corletti
|KO
|2
|July 24, 1968
|align=left| Detroit Olympia, Detroit, Michigan
|align=left|
|-
|Win
|
|align=left| Johnny Featherman
|KO
|2
|May 29, 1968
|align=left| Indiana State Fairgrounds Coliseum, Indianapolis, Indiana
|align=left|
|-
|Win
|
|align=left| Bob Stallings
|UD
|10
|May 8, 1968
|align=left| Palisades Rink, McKeesport, Pennsylvania
|align=left|
|-
|Win
|
|align=left| Dave Russell
|TKO
|7
|April 3, 1968
|align=left| Palisades Rink, McKeesport, Pennsylvania
|align=left|
|-
|Win
|
|align=left| Bob Stallings
|TKO
|7
|December 12, 1967
|align=left| Buffalo Memorial Auditorium, Buffalo, New York
|align=left|
|-
|Win
|
|align=left| Dick Wipperman
|UD
|10
|October 17, 1967
|align=left| Buffalo Memorial Auditorium, Buffalo, New York
|align=left|
|-
|Win
|
|align=left| Toro Smith
|KO
|3
|September 25, 1967
|align=left| Cobo Arena, Detroit, Michigan
|align=left|
|-
|Win
|
|align=left| Willie McMillan
|PTS
|8
|August 24, 1967
|align=left| Detroit, Michigan
|align=left|
|-
|Win
|
|align=left| Aaron Eastling
|KO
|5
|June 5, 1967
|align=left| Milwaukee Auditorium, Milwaukee, Wisconsin
|align=left|
|-
|Win
|
|align=left| Earl Averette
|PTS
|6
|May 12, 1967
|align=left| Detroit, Michigan
|align=left|
|-
|Win
|
|align=left| Buddy Moore
|PTS
|6
|January 25, 1967
|align=left| Palisades Rink, McKeesport, Pennsylvania
|align=left|
|-
|Win
|
|align=left| Mert Brownfield
|PTS
|6
|December 14, 1966
|align=left| Palisades Rink, McKeesport, Pennsylvania
|align=left|
|-
|Win
|
|align=left| Mert Brownfield
|PTS
|4
|November 14, 1966
|align=left| Akron, Ohio
|align=left|
|-
|Win
|
|align=left| Mac Harrison
|KO
|3
|October 26, 1966
|align=left| Akron Armory, Akron, Ohio
|align=left|
|-
|Win
|
|align=left| Larry McGee
|KO
|2
|September 13, 1966
|align=left| Cobo Arena, Detroit, Michigan
|align=left|
|-
|Win
|
|align=left| Vic Brown
|TKO
|1
|August 29, 1966
|align=left| Cobo Arena, Detroit, Michigan
|align=left|
|-
|Win
|
|align=left| John Hall
|TKO
|1
|August 5, 1966
|align=left| Cobo Arena, Detroit, Michigan
|align=left|
|-
|Win
|
|align=left| Gene Hunt
|TKO
|2
|July 11, 1966
|align=left| Cobo Hall, Detroit, Michigan
|align=left|
|-
|Win
|
|align=left| Art Miller
|KO
|1
|June 21, 1966
|align=left| Canton, Ohio
|align=left|

Exhibition boxing record

References

External links
 
 Brief biography
 Article on Lewis
 
 
 Round by round newspaper account of Lewis vs Ali from New York's Irish Arts Center's Fighting Irishmen, A Celebration of the Celtic Warrior
 The Week Ali Charmed Ireland

1943 births
African-American boxers
Boxers from Detroit
Heavyweight boxers
American male boxers
2018 deaths
20th-century African-American sportspeople
21st-century African-American people